A triplet lens is a compound lens consisting of three single lenses. The triplet design is the simplest to give the required number of degrees of freedom to allow the lens designer to overcome all Seidel aberrations.

The three lenses may be cemented together, as in the Steinheil triplet or the Hastings triplet. Or a triplet may be designed with three spaced glasses, as in the Cooke triplet. The former has the advantage of higher optical throughput due to fewer air-glass interfaces, but the latter provides greater flexibility in aberration control, as the internal surfaces are not confined to have the same radii of curvature.

Jewellers' loupes typically use a triplet lens.

See also
Doublet (lens)
Achromatic lens
Apochromatic lens
The five Seidel aberrations
Mangin mirror

References

Lenses
3 (number)